The U.S. Post Office in Joliet, Illinois, is a two-story, building designed by James Knox Taylor. Plans for the Post Office were made in 1899 when Congress approved $100,000 for its construction. The property was purchased from the Robinson family for $15,000. Joliet's rapid growth in the early 20th century necessitated an expansion, and Congress allowed $185,000 for additional land purchase and post office expansion. This was the last major structural change to the building. It operated as the post office for Joliet from 1903 until 1981, when a new building was constructed. It was added to the National Register of Historic Places the year it closed.

See also 
List of United States post offices

References 

Buildings and structures in Joliet, Illinois
History of Joliet, Illinois
Government buildings completed in 1903
Post office buildings on the National Register of Historic Places in Illinois
National Register of Historic Places in Will County, Illinois